Boris Godunov is a 2011 Russian drama film directed by Vladimir Mirzoyev.

Plot
Based on Alexander Pushkin's 1825 play Boris Godunov, the story opens from the scene of the murder in Uglich of the young heir to the Russian throne by unknown persons. It takes several years. Boris Godunov is persuaded to accept the remaining vacant throne, despite his doubts. During the press conference, the clerk announces Godunov’s decision to ascend the kingdom. People are discussing this decision with the TV. Behind the king’s back is the secret, covert struggle of several boyar factions for dominance under the new government. Godunov, who ascended the throne, obsessively pursues the vision of the boy he killed. Meanwhile, the monk Grigory Otrepyev hiding in the Chudov Monastery. After a conversation with Pimen, he learns the secret of the murder runs from the monastery and decides to try to come to power. Enlisting foreign aid and gathering the army, Grigory is sent to Moscow.

Invalid individual choice or a karmic mistake can lead to a chain of fatal events. If a person is in power, it can become a problem for the whole nation.

Cast and characters
 Maksim Sukhanov as Boris Godunov
 Andrey Merzlikin as Grigory Otrepyev, the False Dmitri  
 Leonid Gromov as Vasili Shuysky
 Dmitry Pevtsov as Prince Ivan Mikhailovich Vorotynsky
 Agnia Ditkovskyte as Marina Mniszech
 Valentinas Masalskis as Jerzy Mniszech
 Pyotr Fyodorov as Basmanov
 Leonid Parfyonov as Shchelkalov
 Mikhail Kozakov as Father Pimen
 Andrey Tashkov as Patriarch Job of Moscow
 Yevgeni Ponasenkov as Polish Prince
 Tatyana Lyutaeva as tavern owner
 Yelena Koreneva as episode

Awards and nominations
 Nika Award
  Maksim Sukhanov (Best Actor), Andrey Merzlikin (Best Supporting Actor) – nom

References

External links
 
 Этот ясный объект желания

Films based on works by Aleksandr Pushkin
Russian drama films
2011 drama films
2011 films
Cultural depictions of Boris Godunov
2010s Russian-language films